The Tegelberga Open is a women's professional golf tournament on the Swedish Golf Tour and LET Access Series, played since 2018 at Tegelberga Golf Club in Trelleborg, Sweden.

The 2020, 2021 and 2022 editions were played as part of the Swedish PGA Championship series.

Winners

References

External links

LET Access Series events
Swedish Golf Tour (women) events
Golf tournaments in Sweden